Ignatzschineria is a genus of bacteria from the class Gammaproteobacteria.

References

Oceanospirillales
Bacteria genera